Torrubiella is a genus of fungi in the family Cordycipitaceae. The genus was circumscribed by mycologist Jean Louis Émile Boudier in 1885.

The genus name of Torrubiella is in honour of José Torrubia (1698–1761), who was a Spanish naturalist (Geology and paleontology) and clergyman. He was in 1721 a missionary in the Philippines and then Mexico.

Species

References

Hypocreales genera
Cordycipitaceae